Benjamin Markuš (born 30 January 2001) is a Slovenian football midfielder who plays for Domžale.

References

External links
Benjamin Markuš at NZS 

2001 births
Living people
Slovenian footballers
Slovenia youth international footballers
Slovenia under-21 international footballers
Association football midfielders
NK Domžale players
NK Dob players
Slovenian PrvaLiga players
Slovenian Second League players